"Wild Wild Love" is a song by American rapper Pitbull featuring American-Canadian-English girl group G.R.L. The song was released February 25, 2014, and serves as the lead single off of Pitbull's eighth studio album Globalization. It was written by Pitbull, Ammar Malik, Dr. Luke, Max Martin, Alexander Castillo Vasquez, Michael Everett (co-composer), and Henry Walter, with the production handled by the latter five.

Critical response
Mike Wass of Idolator was complimentary of the song describing it as a "killer single". He did label Pitbull's lyrics "questionable" but are overlooked as he "injects enough humor into the song". Steve Adams of the Winnipeg Free Press gave the song a lukewarm review, giving it two and half stars. He wrote that, compared to "Timber", "Wild Wild Love" was not "nearly as gratingly awful, but it's not anything amazing either". Rolling Stone'''s Joe Gross only commented that Pitbull "doesn't sound entirely sure who [G.R.L.] are".

Chart performance
"Wild Wild Love" peaked at number 30 on the US Billboard Hot 100 chart, making it Pitbull's seventeenth top 40 hit. It peaked at number 6 on the UK, becoming his last top ten hit there. It became G.R.L.'s only single to impact the chart before the group disbanded in 2015. As of March 2015, the single has sold 767,000 copies in the US. The song was also a commercial success in Australia, Belgium, Canada, Finland, New Zealand, Norway, Scotland, Slovakia and Sweden.

Music video
The interior scenes of the music video for "Wild Wild Love" was shot in February 2014 at the Playboy Mansion in Los Angeles, California. The scenes in the second half of the video were done at Viscaya in Miami. The video was first aired on Pitbull's official Facebook page on March 31, 2014.

Usage in media
"Wild Wild Love" was used in the trailer and Big Game Spot of The Secret Life of Pets''.

Charts

Weekly charts

Year-end charts

Certifications

Release history

References

2014 songs
2014 singles
RCA Records singles
Pitbull (rapper) songs
G.R.L. songs
Song recordings produced by Dr. Luke
Song recordings produced by Max Martin
Songs written by Max Martin
Song recordings produced by Cirkut (record producer)
Songs written by Cirkut (record producer)
Songs written by Ammar Malik
Songs written by Pitbull (rapper)
Songs written by Dr. Luke